The Nokia 6120 is the North American variant of the Nokia 6110.

Phone features 

 Four games
 Calculator, clock with alarm and calendar
 Currency converter
 Works as a pager
 Profile settings
 Three colors

Service 
 TDMA 800 / Analog
 Seamless transfer between digital and analog services with DualMode operation

Battery life 
 Extended NiMH Battery 900 mAh
 Digital Talk Time up to 3.25 hours
 Digital Standby Time up to 200 hours
 Analog Talk Time up to 2 hours
 Analog Standby Time up to 50 hours

6120

ru:Nokia 6120